Kym Ruddell (born 19 July 1955) is an Australian former professional tennis player.

While competing on tour, Ruddell appeared in every Australian Open from 1974 to 1980. She was most successful in women's doubles, reaching the semifinals twice and the quarterfinals two times.

Ruddell was runner-up to Judy Tegart-Dalton at the 1975 Australian Hard Court Championships. She was also a doubles finalist in two WTA Tour level tournaments during her career.

In 1977, Ruddell partnered with Karen Krantzcke to win a doubles tournament in Tallahassee. After they won the final and were due to pick up their winner's cheques, Krantzcke decided to go for a jog and suffered a fatal heart attack around 200 metres from the courts.

WTA Tour finals

Doubles (0–2)

References

External links
 
 

1955 births
Living people
Australian female tennis players